Australind is a town in Western Australia, located 12 km north-east of Bunbury's central business district. Its local government area is the Shire of Harvey. At the 2016 census, Australind had a population of 14,539.

History
Prior to European settlement, the area was home to the Wardandi people. Early explorers and settlers found them to be excellent trackers, and many of them found employment on farms. The first sighting of the coast was by Captain A. P. Jonk in the VOC ship Emeloort, who sighted land at 33°12' S (most likely opposite the estuary from Australind) on 24 February 1658 while looking for Vergulde Draeck, but did not land. A few months later, Elburg, under Capt. J. P. Peereboom, anchored off what is now Bunbury. Peerboom met three Aboriginal people, and returned to Batavia on 16 July 1658. In 1802–03, Nicolas Baudin visited the coast and explored the estuary and nearby rivers. He named Point Casuarina in Bunbury after one of his ships , and the Leschenault Inlet after on-board botanist Jean Baptiste Leschenault de la Tour.

The name Australind is a combination of Australia and India, which was chosen due to the belief that the area could be used for breeding horses for the British Indian Army, as was later done at Cervantes, Northampton and Madura. In 1840, the Western Australian Land Company purchased  of land with a plan to create an English-style village populated by settlers. The area had been mapped in 1831 by John Septimus Roe and explored by land by Lieutenant Henry Bunbury in 1836. A detailed plan of the town included a town square, church, a school, stores, a mill and a public hall. Marshall Clifton, who arrived on Parkfield in 1841, was appointed leader of the 440 settlers. However, in January 1841, the Swan River Colony's Methodist minister Rev. John Smithies wrote in the following terms to the Wesleyan Missionary Society in London:

If any of your friends are thinking of Austral-Ind as a point of emigration tell them to Stop. It is one of the greatest puffs that there has been for some time. I should be sorry if any of our Methodist friends or others should be so deluded as to embark for such a place.

Before long, the settlement began to fail owing to poor soils and climate — no water in summer and too much of it in winter — and the settlers drifted away. Little of the planned town was ever developed. The company folded, the land was mostly resumed by the Crown, and the settlement plans were officially abandoned in 1875.

A bridge was built over the Brunswick River to allow nearby settlers to make use of the township's services, so that in the 1860s, Australind was surviving with a school, post office and store. However, growth was negligible and, in the 1890s, construction of the Perth to Bunbury railway via Pinjarra shifted the focus of development to agricultural and timber towns further inland. The population of Australind fell to 33 (15 males and 18 females) in 1898. In the 1971 census, 418 people lived in the Australind area.

The Parkfield name lives on in a nearby rural locality and in a primary school in northern Australind. A handful of historic buildings, including St Nicholas Church (1848) and Henton Cottage (1841) on Paris Road, and Clifton's former residence Upton House (1847) on Old Coast Road, still exist in the town. The Historic St Nicholas Church building, originally a worker's cottage, is 3.6 metres in width and 8.2 metres in length, and is believed to be the smallest church in Australia, while Henton Cottage was the town's first hotel.

In the 20th century, the district's residential and recreational appeal gradually attracted more development as Bunbury expanded to become a city. The Bunbury Golf Course was built in 1948 at nearby Clifton Park. Industries including a titanium dioxide pigment factory and waste-water plant were established there, and suburban development as part of "Greater Bunbury" saw the town quadruple in size by 1981.

A primary school opened in 1980, relieving pressure on that of nearby Eaton, and was followed by a high school which opened in 1987. New residential estates opened, and in the mid-1980s the State Government and the Shire of Harvey made plans to relocate most of the industries to a new industrial park at nearby Kemerton. By 2001, Australind was predominantly residential, the census reporting over 10,000 residents, more than half of whom were first- or second-generation British immigrants, with a notable Italian minority.

Geography

Australind is bordered to the south by the Collie River, to the west by the Leschenault Estuary and to the east by the Brunswick River. It includes the estates of Galway Green and Clifton Park. The suburbs of Leschenault and Kemerton have seceded from Australind since the 1980s.

James Battye described the area thus:
Australind is beautifully situated on the eastern side of Leschenault Inlet, at a distance of about six miles (10 km) from Koombanah Bay, or, as it has been generally called, Port Leschenault, a good roadstead, within Point Casuarina, at the eastern extremity of Geographe Bay. The bay is open only from north or north and by east to west-north-west or west and by north; but as there is a strong undercurrent setting out, ships ride safely even in heavy gales from that quarter.

Facilities
Australind has the Australind Village Shopping Centre, which contains a Coles supermarket, Aldi and various speciality stores. Treendale, a residential estate in Australind, is the location of the Treendale Shopping Centre, including a Woolworths supermarket which opened in February 2012. A 24/7 Spudshed supermarket opened off Paris Road in 2016. The 18-hole Bunbury Golf Club, which hosts the annual South West Open each June, is located within the Clifton Park estate in Australind.

Education
Australind has two high schools: Australind Senior High School and Our Lady of Mercy College, as well as six primary schools: Australind (1980), Treendale (2014), Clifton Park (1988), Parkfield (1993), Kingston (2009), and Leschenault Catholic Primary School.

Transport
Australind is served by the 841 (Australind) route from Bunbury's central bus station, with a journey time of approximately 32 minutes. The route is operated by TransBunbury for the Public Transport Authority.

Despite the name, the Transwa Australind rail service does not stop in or transit the town.

Gallery

References

External links
 Area history - Bunbury Port Authority
 Australind website
 Schooling at Australind - Harvey District Oral History Group
 Bunbury Golf Club
 Australind Baptist Church

Suburbs of Bunbury, Western Australia
Coastal towns in Western Australia
Shire of Harvey
1841 establishments in Australia